St Ruth is a locality split between the Western Downs Region and the Toowoomba Region in Queensland, Australia. In the  St Ruth had a population of 139 people.

History 
The locality was originally called St Ruth's after the parish name which was in turn named after the St Ruth's pastoral run taken up as part of Cecil Plains pastoral run by Henry Stuart Russell in 1842. It was separated from Cecil Plains in 1842 by Richard Jones, probably for the Aberdeen Company. Later the name was simplified to be St Ruth.

In 1877,  of land was resumed from the St Ruth pastoral run to establish smaller farms. The land was offered for selection on 24 April 1877.

St Ruth Provisional School opened circa 1888. In 1918 it became a half-time school in conjunction with West Prairie Provisional School (meaning the schools shared a single teacher). In 1919 it returned to full-time school status but then closed in 1920.

In the  St Ruth had a population of 139 people.

Road infrastructure
The Dalby–Cecil Plains Road (State Route 82) runs through from north to south.

References 

Western Downs Region
Toowoomba Region
Localities in Queensland